Jiang Ke (姜恪) (died March 21, 672), formally the Duke of Yong'an (永安公), was an official and general of the Chinese Tang Dynasty, serving as chancellor for several years during the reign of Emperor Gaozong.

Background 
Despite Jiang Ke's high status, little is firmly established about his background or career except for the years that he served as chancellor—as, unusual for a chancellor, he did not have a biography in either the Old Book of Tang or the New Book of Tang. (The table of chancellors family trees in the New Book of Tang indicated that his father was the general Jiang Baoyi (姜寶誼), who served during the reign of the founding emperor Emperor Gaozu, but oddly enough did not list him as one of Jiang Baoyi's sons in Jiang Baoyi's biography, as would be customary.) Little is known about Jiang Ke's career prior to his becoming chancellor in 665, although it was noted in the biography of his colleague Yan Liben that he was a renowned general who was promoted for his battlefield achievements.  The only real record of his military accomplishment came in 662, when he served as the deputy of the general Qibi Heli (契苾何力) in a campaign to pacify the Tiele tribes (of whom Qibi's own tribe was related) -- a successful one, as Qibi was able to persuade the tribes to give up the chieftains who had rebelled against Tang and to resubmit to Tang.

Service under Emperor Gaozong 
In 665, Jiang Ke was serving as the minister of defense, when Emperor Gaozong gave him the additional designation of Tong Dong Xi Tai Sanpin (同東西臺三品), making him a chancellor de facto.  Around the new year 669, Jiang was made acting Zuo Xiang (左相) -- the head of the examination bureau of government (東臺, Dong Tai) -- and a post considered one for a chancellor still.

In fall 670, in the aftermaths of a major defeat that the generals Xue Rengui and Guo Daifeng (郭待封) suffered at the hands of Tufan's prime minister Gar Trinring Tsendro ("Lun Qinling" (論欽陵) in Chinese) earlier that year, Emperor Gaozong commissioned Jiang with an army to attack Tufan, but if the army was actually launched, the results were not recorded in history.  In 671, he was formally made the head of the examination bureau, with the title now being Shizhong (侍中). Jiang died in 672 with the title of the Duke of Yong'an (which he apparently inherited from Jiang Baoyi), but his posthumous name, if any, was not recorded in history.

Notes and references 

 Zizhi Tongjian, vols. 200, 201.

672 deaths
Chancellors under Emperor Gaozong of Tang
Tang dynasty generals
Year of birth unknown